Roland Doré may refer to:

Roland Doré (administrator), former President of the Canadian Space Agency
Roland Doré (sculptor), 17th-century sculptor